Blair Mound is a historic archaeological site located near Winnsboro, Fairfield County, South Carolina. Blair Mound is an earthen mound structure in the form of a low, oval hummock.

The mound was constructed on the site of a late Woodland trash midden. It represents a late phase of the widespread Mississippian culture Pattern, and appears to have been constructed by A.D. 1300–1400.

It was added to the National Register of Historic Places in 1974.

References

Archaeological sites on the National Register of Historic Places in South Carolina
National Register of Historic Places in Fairfield County, South Carolina